Selinous or Selinountas may refer to:

Communities
Selinunte, an ancient Greek archaeological site on the south coast of Sicily
Selinous (Laconia), a village in ancient Laconia
Selinous (Sporades), a town of the ancient Sporades islands in Greece
Selinountas, Achaea, a village near Aigio, Achaea, Greece
Selinous, Arcadia, an ancient town near present Kosmas, Arcadia, Greece

River
Selinountas (river), a river in Achaea, Greece

See also
Selinus (disambiguation)